Kalusa may refer to:
Kalusa, India
Kalusa, Iran